Chigoziem Caleb Chukwuemeka (born 25 January 2002) is an English professional footballer who plays as a forward for  club Crawley Town, on loan from Aston Villa. He is a product of the Northampton Town academy and debuted for their senior side in 2020, making 28 appearances that season before a transfer to Aston Villa in August 2021.

Career

Northampton Town
Chukwuemeka started his career at Northampton Town and joined Corby Town on loan in February 2020, where he made three appearances in the league, scoring once. In July 2020 Chukwuemeka spent a month on trial at Kettering Town playing in three friendly matches. He made his senior debut for Northampton Town on 12 September 2020 as a late substitute in a 2–2 draw with AFC Wimbledon, before starting his first match for the club four days later in a 4–0 EFL Cup defeat to Bristol City. He scored his first goal for Northampton in an EFL Trophy tie against Southampton U21s on 6 October 2020, and scored his first league goal later that month with Northampton's third goal in a 3–2 victory over Wigan Athletic on 31 October.

Aston Villa
On 16 August 2021, Chukwuemeka signed for Premier League team Aston Villa for an undisclosed fee. He entered their Academy where he was reunited with younger brother Carney. On 24 August 2021, he made his Aston Villa debut, coming on as a substitute for his brother, in a 6–0 EFL Cup victory over Barrow. He was awarded Premier League 2 player of the month for September 2021 - after scoring five goals and providing one assist in three matches in that period.

On 12 January 2022, Chukwuemeka joined Scottish Premiership side Livingston on loan until the end of the season. He made his debut on 18 January 2022, as a second-half substitute in a 2–0 home victory over Dundee. On 22 January, Chukwuemeka was substituted only 7 minutes after entering the field in a match against Aberdeen. Livingston manager David Martindale criticised Chukwuemeka's workrate, but insisted that he still had what it takes to be a success. 

On 1 September 2022, Chukwuemeka joined League Two club Crawley Town on a season-long loan with an obligation to buy. He made his debut 2 days later, in a 2–2 draw against Salford City.

Personal life
Chukwuemeka's younger brother Carney plays for Chelsea.

Career statistics

References

External links
 

2002 births
Living people
English footballers
Association football forwards
Northampton Town F.C. players
Corby Town F.C. players
Aston Villa F.C. players
Livingston F.C. players
Crawley Town F.C. players
English Football League players
Southern Football League players
Scottish Professional Football League players
Black British sportspeople
English sportspeople of Nigerian descent